The Enchanted (simplified Chinese: 浴女图) is considered the ninth Malaysian production by Mediacorp Studios Malaysia. Filming began in 2012 and took place in Kuala Lumpur, Malaysia. It made its debut in Singapore on 15 August 2013, though it first aired in Malaysia's Astro Shuang Xing on 9 May 2013. It stars Chen Hanwei, Paige Chua, Moo Yan Yee, Ya Hui, Akit Tay and Tracy Lee as casts of this series. It is shown on weekdays at 7pm.

Cast

 Chen Hanwei as Shi Zhuang Bi 石壮弼 / Ah Bi 阿弼
 Paige Chua as Chen Jingli 陈景丽 / Monitor 班长
 Moo Yan Yee as Qian Jiayi 钱佳怡
 Ya Hui as Liang Lulu 梁露露
 Akit Tay 郑子娟 as Qi Mingxing 戚明星 / Seven : Tay was approached by a production company to go to an audition by Mediacorp Studios Malaysia. After the audition, she was given the role of Qi, one of the main leads, and was also signed by Mediacorp as an artiste.
 Tracy Lee as Bai Xuena 白雪娜 / Snow White
 Desmond Tan as Du Jiahong 杜家泓
 Aileen Tan as Huang Song Li 黄颂莉
 JC Chee 朱畯丞 as Xie Zhifei 谢志飞
 Adam Chen as Hu Yong Cheng 胡永晟
 Cathryn Lee 李元玲 as Yao Dingding 姚丁丁
 Zhang Wenxiang as Qian Zhong Ming 钱仲铭
 Joelin Wong as Yang Rui Qi 杨瑞琪

Release
The drama was announced to premiere in October 2012 in Singapore but was delayed to August 2013 instead, though Malaysia's Astro Shuang Xing aired it earlier on 9 May 2013, cancelling the broadcast of 96°C Café.

See also
List of MediaCorp Channel 8 Chinese Drama Series (2010s)

References

2013 Singaporean television series debuts
Singapore Chinese dramas
Chinese-language drama television series in Malaysia
Singapore–Malaysia television co-productions
Channel 8 (Singapore) original programming